Vitali Sitnikov (born September 16, 1981) is a Russian professional ice hockey forward who currently plays with PSK Sakhalin in the Asia League Ice Hockey (ALIH).

On November 28, 2015 during a KHL game, Sitnikov was accidentally struck on the throat by the blade of Ladislav Nagy's skate. He immediately went to the bench where upon removing his jersey it was discovered that the skate had slashed his throat which was bleeding. He then proceeded to fall back on the bench before receiving medical attention. He required surgery to close the cut and missed one game.

References

External links

1981 births
Living people
Avtomobilist Yekaterinburg players
HC 07 Detva players
HC MVD players
PSK Sakhalin players
Saryarka Karagandy players
Severstal Cherepovets players
Sputnik Nizhny Tagil players
HC Yugra players
Russian ice hockey forwards
People from Nizhny Tagil
Sportspeople from Sverdlovsk Oblast
Russian expatriate sportspeople in Kazakhstan
Russian expatriate sportspeople in Slovakia
Expatriate ice hockey players in Kazakhstan
Expatriate ice hockey players in Slovakia
Russian expatriate ice hockey people